HMS Stag was a 32-gun fifth-rate frigate built for the Royal Navy. She was ordered in 1790 and work began in March 1792 at Chatham Docks. Completed in August 1794, Stag spent much of her service in home waters, where she worked to protect British shipping from French privateers.

In March 1800, Stag joined John Borlase Warren's squadron and took part in the unsuccessful Ferrol Expedition that August. At the end of the month, she was in a detachment under Samuel Hood that captured an 18-gun French privateer, Gueppe, in a cutting-out expedition in the Narrows of Redondela. On 6 September Stag was in Vigo bay where she was caught in a violent storm and driven ashore. Her crew and provisions were removed and she was set on fire the following day.

Construction and armament
HMS Stag was a 32-gun, Royal Navy frigate of the Pallas class. The original shipwright, John Nelson, died a year later and was replaced by Thomas Pollard. The cost of construction and first fitting was £21,397.0.0.

As a fifth-rate frigate, Stag was designed to carry a main battery of twenty-six  guns on the upper deck with a secondary armament of four  guns and four  carronades on the quarterdeck and two  guns and two  carronades on the forecastle. Initially intended for a crew of 257, this was reduced  to 254 from 1796.

Career
Stag was launched on 28 June 1794, and commissioned by Captain Joseph Yorke in July. Following her fitting out, completed on 16 August, she served on the Irish Station and then the Channel. In August 1795, she captured the Dutch frigate Alliante in the North Sea.

Action of 22 August 1795

On 12 August, Stag joined a small squadron comprising HMS Isis, 50 guns, HMS Reunion, 36 guns, and  Vestal. On the 22nd, the squadron was cruising off the coast of Norway when at around 13:00, it spotted two ships and a cutter to windward and heading towards shore on a larboard tack. These ships proved to be the 36-gun frigates, Alliantie and Argo, and the 16-gun cutter, Vlugheld. A favourable wind change allowed Stag to overhaul the rear most ship, Alliantie, and bring her to action at about 16:15 while the remaining British ships engaged in a running battle with Argo and Vlugheld. After an hour's fighting, Stag managed to force the surrender of her larger opponent but Argo, despite suffering much damage, and Vlugheld escaped into port at 17:30. The engagement left Stag with four men killed and 13 wounded.

A prize crew under Stag's first lieutenant, Patrick Tonyn, took Alliantie to The Nore. She was subsequently purchased by the Admiralty and entered the Royal Navy as the frigate, HMS Alliance. Stag's share of the prize money for the ship and stores was £1,741.04.07d.

Capture of Bonne Citoyenne

Bonne Citoyenne was part of a French force bound for Mauritius. Badly damaged and  separated from the others by a storm in the Bay of Biscay, she was chased by the British frigate squadron and eventually overhauled by Phaeton to which she surrendered to after a few shots.

Fight against privateering
On 12 February 1797, Stag captured three privateers and retook a captured British merchant vessel, Swallow. While off the Isles of Scilly on 21 February 1797, Stag captured the 14-gun brig, Appocrate and destroyed the cutter Hirondelle. The following day, she recaptured the British merchantman, Sarah and arrived at Spithead on 2 March.
Stag took more privateers and their prizes in September. At the end of the month, she destroyed a 4-gun French lugger near Plymouth. Stag was again with Phaeton on 24 November, when they captured the French privateer, Resolu, a brig of 18 guns. Resolu was travelling with two prizes, General Wolfe from Poole and an American sloop which had been on its way from Boston, Massachusetts to Hamburg. Stag sailed off after the latter and eventually recaptured her.

On the night of 26 December, Stag was anchored in Cawsand Bay when she was visited by four customs officers, one of whom appeared to be seriously injured but on closer inspection by the ship's surgeon was revealed to be dead. Acting on information they had received, the revenue men had taken a boat out to Penlee Point where they discovered a large sloop and several smaller vessels. On being challenged, the smugglers exchanged fire with the revenue men before sailing off.

On 9 October the following year, she was in a squadron of six vessels that took the Spanish brig, Nostra Senora de la Solidad, then, on 16 October, she and  captured a Spanish schooner. Her last recorded action against privateers in the Channel, occurred on 19 of that month, when, with Cambrian, she captured the 10-gun, Heureux. The two British frigates were off the entrance to the Garonne when they spotted and chased two enemy vessels. Stag captured Heureux while Cambrian sailed after the second, a privateer of 26 guns, which eventually escaped.

Later service and fate
In March 1800, Stag came under the command of Captain Robert Winthrop. Part of John Borlase Warren's squadron, she took part in Ferrol Expedition that August.

At the end of the month, Stag was in a detachment under Samuel Hood that captured a French privateer, Gueppe, in a cutting-out expedition. Gueppe, a flush-deck ship of 300 tons and carrying 18 guns, was initially in the harbour at Vigo but, when the British force entered the bay on 29 August, was moved to near the Narrows of Redondela where she anchored below a shore battery. The boats left at 21:00 and arrived alongside their quarry at 00:40 the following morning. Despite fierce resistance, Gueppe was taken within 15 minutes of boarding, after having 25 of her crew killed and forty wounded.

On 6 September Stag was in Vigo bay where she was caught in a violent storm and driven ashore. Her crew and provisions were removed and she was set on fire the following day.

Prizes

Notes

Citations

References
 
 
 
 
 

Fifth-rate frigates of the Royal Navy
1794 ships
Ships built in Kent